You Only Live Twice is a 1967 spy film and the fifth in the James Bond series produced by Eon Productions, starring Sean Connery as the fictional MI6 agent James Bond. It is the first Bond film to be directed by Lewis Gilbert, who later directed the 1977 film The Spy Who Loved Me and the 1979 film Moonraker, both starring Roger Moore. The screenplay of You Only Live Twice was written by Roald Dahl, and loosely based on Ian Fleming's 1964 novel of the same name. It is the first James Bond film to discard most of Fleming's plot, using only a few characters and locations from the book as the background for an entirely new story.

In the film, Bond is dispatched to Japan after American and Soviet crewed spacecraft vanish mysteriously in orbit, each nation blaming the other amidst the Cold War. Bond travels secretly to a remote Japanese island to find the perpetrators, and comes face-to-face with Ernst Stavro Blofeld, the head of SPECTRE. The film reveals the appearance of Blofeld, who was previously only seen from the neck down. SPECTRE is working for the government of an unnamed Asian power, implied to be the People's Republic of China, to provoke war between the superpowers.

During the filming in Japan, it was announced that Sean Connery would retire from the role of Bond, but after one film's absence, he returned in 1971's Diamonds Are Forever and later 1983's non-Eon Bond film Never Say Never Again. You Only Live Twice received positive reviews and grossed over $111 million in worldwide box office. However, it was the first Bond film to see a decline in box-office revenue, owing to the oversaturation of the spy film genre from Bond imitators, including a competing Bond film, Casino Royale, from Columbia Pictures (1967). The Bond series continued with On Her Majesty's Secret Service in 1969, the first film without Sean Connery in the lead role.

Plot 
American NASA spacecraft Jupiter 16 is hijacked from orbit by an unidentified spaceship. The United States suspects it to be the work of the Soviets, but the British suspect Japanese involvement since the spacecraft landed in the Sea of Japan.

Bond attends a sumo match where he is approached by Japanese secret service agent Aki, who takes him to meet local MI6 operative Dikko Henderson. Henderson claims to have critical evidence about the rogue craft, but is killed by a hitman before he can elaborate. Bond chases and kills the assailant, taking the assailant's clothing as a disguise, and is driven in the getaway car to Osato Chemicals. Once there, Bond subdues the driver and breaks into the office safe of the company's president, Mr. Osato. After obtaining secret documents, Bond is pursued by armed security, but is rescued by Aki, who flees to a secluded subway station. Bond chases her, but falls down a trap door leading to the office of the head of the Japanese secret service, Tiger Tanaka. The stolen documents are examined, and found to include a photograph of the cargo ship Ning-Po, with a microdot message saying the tourist who took the photo was killed as a security precaution.

Bond goes back to Osato Chemicals to meet Osato, masquerading as a potential buyer. Osato humors Bond, but after their meeting orders his secretary, Helga Brandt, to have him killed; both are SPECTRE agents. Outside the building, assassins open fire on Bond before Aki rescues him again. Bond and Aki drive to Kobe, where the Ning-Po is docked. They investigate the company's dock facilities, and discover that the ship was delivering elements for rocket fuel. They are discovered, but Bond eludes the henchmen until Aki gets away; however, Bond is captured. He wakes, tied up in Brandt's cabin on the Ning-Po. Brandt interrogates Bond, before seducing him. Brandt flies Bond to Tokyo the next day, but en route, she sets off a flare in the plane, seals Bond in his seat and bails out. Bond lands the plane and flees before it explodes.

After finding out where the Ning-Po unloaded, Bond flies over the area in a heavily armed autogyro created by Q. Near a volcano, Bond is attacked by and defeats four helicopters, confirming his suspicions of a nearby base. A Soviet spacecraft is captured in orbit by another unidentified craft, heightening tensions with the United States. The mysterious spaceship lands in an extensive base hidden inside the volcano, operated by Ernst Stavro Blofeld of SPECTRE, who has been hired by a great power to start a Soviet-American war. Blofeld summons Osato and Brandt to his quarters for not having killed Bond; Osato blames Brandt, and as she leaves, Blofeld drops her to her death into a pool filled with piranhas. Blofeld then orders Osato to kill Bond.

In Kyoto, Bond prepares to conduct a closer investigation of the island by training with Tanaka's ninjas and donning a Japanese disguise, which will include a staged marriage to an Ama diving girl. Aki is inadvertently poisoned to death by a SPECTRE assassin targeting Bond and he is then introduced to Tanaka's student, Kissy Suzuki who will perform the role of his wife. Acting on Kissy's lead, the pair reconnoitre a cave booby-trapped with phosgene gas, and the volcano above it. Establishing that the mouth of the volcano is a disguised hatch to the secret rocket base, Bond slips in, while Kissy goes to alert Tanaka. Bond locates and frees the captured American and Soviet astronauts and, with their help, steals a space suit to infiltrate the SPECTRE spacecraft, "Bird One". However, Blofeld spots Bond, and he is detained while Bird One is launched. Bond is taken into the control room where he meets Blofeld, who kills Osato to demonstrate the price of failure.

Bird One closes in on an American space capsule, and U.S. forces prepare to launch a nuclear attack on the USSR. Meanwhile, Tanaka's ninjas approach the base's entrance, but are detected and fired upon. Bond distracts Blofeld and lets in the ninjas. During the battle, Tanaka saves Bond by disarming Blofeld with his shuriken. Bond fights his way to the control room, tosses Blofeld's bodyguard Hans into the piranha pool, and activates Bird One's self-destruct before it reaches the American craft. As the Americans stand down their forces, Blofeld activates the base's self-destruct system and escapes. Bond, Kissy, Tanaka, and the surviving ninjas leave before the eruption destroys the base, and are picked up by the Japanese Maritime Forces and the British Secret Service.

Cast 

 Sean Connery as James Bond, an MI6 agent
 Akiko Wakabayashi as Aki, an agent with the Japanese SIS who assists Bond
 Mie Hama as Kissy Suzuki, an ama girl who marries Bond as an undercover ploy; she is never referred to by name
 Nikki van der Zyl (uncredited) as the voice of Kissy Suzuki
 Tetsurō Tamba as Tiger Tanaka, head of Japanese secret service (voice dubbed by Robert Rietty).
 Teru Shimada as Mr. Osato, a Japanese industrialist secretly affiliated to SPECTRE
 Karin Dor as Helga Brandt/No. 11, a SPECTRE assassin
 Francesca Tu (uncredited) as Mr. Osato's secretary 
 Donald Pleasence as Ernst Stavro Blofeld, the megalomaniacal head of the terrorist syndicate known as SPECTRE
 Bernard Lee as M, the head of MI6
 Lois Maxwell as Miss Moneypenny, M's secretary
 Desmond Llewelyn as Q, head of MI6 technical department
 Charles Gray as Dikko Henderson, British contact living in Japan. Gray would later play Blofeld in Diamonds Are Forever, opposite Sean Connery.
 Tsai Chin as Chinese Girl (Hong Kong), Ling, undercover MI6 agent
 Peter Fanene Maivia as Car Driver, one of Osato's henchmen, who fights Bond in Osato's office
 Burt Kwouk as Spectre Number 3, one of Blofeld's henchmen. Kwouk had previously played the Chinese agent Mr. Ling in Goldfinger.
 Michael Chow as Spectre Number 4, one of Blofeld's henchmen and Mr Osato's secretary 
 Ronald Rich as Blofeld's bodyguard, Hans
 David Toguri as Assassin (Bedroom), one of Osato's henchmen, who kills Aki
 John Stone as Submarine Captain
 Norman Jones as Astronaut – 1st American Spacecraft
 Paul Carson as Astronaut – 1st American Spacecraft
 Laurence Herder as Cosmonaut – Soviet Spacecraft
 Richard Graydon as Cosmonaut – Soviet Spacecraft
 Bill Mitchell as Astronaut – 2nd American Spacecraft
 George Roubicek as Astronaut – 2nd American Spacecraft
 Alexander Knox as the US President 
 Ed Bishop (uncredited) as NASA Hawaii technician, who warns 1st American spacecraft of approaching unidentified craft. Bishop would later play the also uncredited role of Klaus Hergersheimer in Diamonds Are Forever.
 Frazer Hines (uncredited) as Spectre Number 4 (Mr. Osato's Secretary) (voice)
 Shane Rimmer (uncredited) as NASA Hawaii technician. This was Rimmer's first contribution to the Bond franchise, as he would later appear as Tom in Diamonds Are Forever (uncredited), Live and Let Die (albeit as a voice and uncredited) and as Commander Carter in The Spy Who Loved Me.
 Richard Marner (uncredited) as Soviet Controller 
 Anthony Ainley (uncredited) as Hong Kong Policeman

Production 

On Her Majesty's Secret Service was the intended next film after Thunderball (1965), but the producers decided to adapt You Only Live Twice instead because OHMSS would require searching for high and snowy locations. Lewis Gilbert originally declined the offer to direct, but accepted after producer Albert R. Broccoli called him saying: "You can't give up this job. It's the largest audience in the world." Peter R. Hunt, who edited the first five Bond films, believed that Gilbert had been contracted by the producers for other work but they found they had to use him. Ted Moore, the director of photography on the first four films, was unavailable because he was filming A Man for All Seasons and was replaced by Freddie Young.

Gilbert, Young, producers Broccoli and Harry Saltzman, and production designer Ken Adam then went to Japan, spending three weeks searching for locations. SPECTRE's shore fortress headquarters was changed to an extinct volcano after the team learned that the Japanese do not build castles by the sea. The group was due to return to the UK on a BOAC Boeing 707 flight (BOAC Flight 911) on 5 March 1966, but cancelled after being told they had a chance to watch a ninja demonstration. That flight crashed 25 minutes after takeoff, killing all on board. In Tokyo, the crew also found Hunt, who decided to go on holiday after having his request to direct declined. Hunt was invited to direct the second unit for You Only Live Twice and accepted the job.

Unlike most James Bond films, which usually feature various locations around the world, almost the entire film is set in one country, and several minutes are devoted to an elaborate Japanese wedding. This is in keeping with Fleming's original novel, which also devoted a number of pages to the discussion of Japanese culture. Toho Studios provided soundstages, personnel, and the female Japanese stars to the producers.

Writing 
The first draft was written by Sydney Boehm based closely on the original novel. The producers had Harold Jack Bloom come to Japan with them to write a screenplay. His work was ultimately rejected, but since several of his ideas were used in the final script, he was given the credit of "Additional Story Material". Among these elements were the opening with Bond's fake death and burial at sea, and the ninja attack. As the screenwriter of the previous Bond films, Richard Maibaum, was unavailable, Roald Dahl (a close friend of Ian Fleming) was chosen to write the adaptation, despite having no prior experience writing a screenplay except for the uncompleted The Bells of Hell Go Ting-a-ling-a-ling.

Dahl said that the original novel was "Fleming's worst book, with no plot in it which would even make a movie", and compared it to a travelogue, stating that he had to create a new plot though "I could retain only four or five of the original story's ideas." On creating the plot, Dahl said he "did not know what the hell Bond was going to do" despite having to deliver the first draft in six weeks, and decided to do a basic plot similar to Dr. No. He was inspired by the story of a missing nuclear-armed U.S. Air Force bomber over Spain and by the Soviet Union and the United States' recent first spacewalks from Voskhod 2 and Gemini 4. Dahl was given a free rein on his script, except for the character of Bond and "the girl formula", involving three women for Bond to seduce – an ally and a henchwoman who both get killed, and the main Bond girl. While the third involved a character from the book, Kissy Suzuki, Dahl had to create Aki and Helga Brandt to fulfil the rest.

Gilbert was mostly collaborative with Dahl's work, as the writer declared: "He not only helped in script conferences, but had some good ideas and then left you alone, and when you produced the finished thing, he shot it. Other directors have such an ego that they want to rewrite it and put their own dialogue in, and it's usually disastrous. What I admired so much about Lewis Gilbert was that he just took the screenplay and shot it. That's the way to direct: You either trust your writer or you don't."
Charles Gray, who played Dikko Henderson, actually says the famous "shaken not stirred" line the other way round saying "that is stirred not shaken, that was right wasn't it?" Bond replies "Perfect."

Casting 

When the time came to begin You Only Live Twice, the producers were faced with the problem of a disenchanted star. Sean Connery had stated that he was tired of playing James Bond and all of the associated commitment (time spent filming and publicising each movie), together with finding it difficult to do other work, which would potentially lead to typecasting. Saltzman and Broccoli were able to persuade Connery by increasing his fee for the film, but geared up to look for a replacement.

Jan Werich was originally cast by producer Harry Saltzman to play Blofeld. Upon his arrival at the Pinewood set, both producer Albert R. Broccoli and director Lewis Gilbert felt that he was a poor choice, resembling a "poor, benevolent Father Christmas". Nonetheless, in an attempt to make the casting work, Gilbert continued filming. After several days, both Gilbert and Broccoli determined that Werich was not menacing enough, and recast Blofeld with Donald Pleasence in the role. Pleasence's ideas for Blofeld's appearance included a hump, a limp, a beard, and a lame hand, before he settled on the scar. He found it uncomfortable, though, because of the glue that attached it to his eye.

Many European models were tested for Helga Brandt, including German actress Eva Renzi who passed on the film, with German actress Karin Dor being cast. Dor performed the stunt of diving into a pool to depict Helga's demise, without the use of a double. Dor was dubbed by a different actress for the German release.

UA CEO Bud Ornstein met with Toshiro Mifune in the Canary Islands to try to convince him to play Tiger Tanaka, but he was already committed to appear in Grand Prix. Gilbert had chosen Tetsurō Tamba after working with him in The 7th Dawn. A number of martial arts experts were hired as the ninjas. The two Japanese female parts proved difficult to cast, due to most of the actresses tested having little English. Akiko Wakabayashi and Mie Hama, both Toho Studios stars, were eventually chosen and started taking English classes in the UK. Hama, initially cast in the role of Tanaka's assistant, had difficulty with the language. Initially the producers were going to fire her, but after Tamba suggested she would commit suicide if they did so instead switched her role with Wakabayashi, who had been cast as Kissy, a part with less dialogue. Wakabayashi only requested that her character name, "Suki", be changed to "Aki".

Filming 

Filming of You Only Live Twice lasted from July 1966 to March 1967.

The film was shot primarily in Japan, and most of the locations are identifiable.

In summary:

 Tokyo: After arriving in Japan at Akime, Bond goes to Tokyo. The initial scenes are set in and around the Ginza area. The Hotel New Otani Tokyo served as the outside for Osato Chemicals, and the hotel's gardens were used for scenes of the ninja training. A car chase using the Toyota 2000GT and a Toyota Crown was largely filmed in the area around the Olympic Stadium used previously for the 1964 Summer Olympics. Tokyo Tower and the centre of Tokyo can be briefly seen in a sequence where the villain's car is dropped in Tokyo Bay. Tanaka's private subway station was filmed at the Tokyo Metro's Nakano-shimbashi Station. A sumo wrestling match was filmed at Tokyo's sumo hall, the Kuramae Kokugikan; this has since been demolished.
 Kobe Docks appears in a sequence when Bond investigates the ship Ning-Po, and is involved in a fight.
 Bond's wedding at a Shinto Shrine was filmed in Nachi.
 Himeji Castle in Hyōgo Prefecture was depicted as Tanaka's ninja training camp.
 The village of Bonotsucho Akime was where Bond and his Ama wife lived and where the Ama scenes were shot.
 The ryokan Shigetomi-so (now known as Shimazu Shigetomisoh Manor) was used as the exterior of Tanaka's house.
 Kagoshima Prefecture was the location for various scenes depicting Little Nellie (see below).
 Mount Shinmoe-dake in Kyūshū was used for the exteriors of SPECTRE's headquarters.

Most of the interiors were shot at Pinewood. The opening sequence in Hong Kong used some location footage of a street in Kowloon. Hong Kong's Victoria Harbour is also shown, but the at-sea burial of Bond and the retrieval of the corpse was filmed off Gibraltar and the Bahamas. The scenes with the light aircraft ferrying Bond to his supposed death were shot over very English-looking countryside in Buckinghamshire, whereas this was supposed to be Japan.

Large crowds were present in Japan to see the shooting. A Japanese fan began following Sean Connery with a camera, and police had to deal with fan incursions several times during shooting.

The heavily armed WA-116 autogyro "Little Nellie" was included after Ken Adam heard a radio interview with its inventor, RAF Wing Commander Ken Wallis. Little Nellie was named after music hall star Nellie Wallace, who has a similar surname to its inventor. Wallis piloted his invention, which was equipped with various mock-up armaments by John Stears' special effects team, during production.

"Nellie"'s battle with helicopters proved to be difficult to film. The scenes were initially shot in Miyazaki, first with takes of the gyrocopter, with more than 85 take-offs, five hours of flight and Wallis nearly crashing into the camera several times. A scene filming the helicopters from above created a major downdraft, and cameraman John Jordan's foot was severed by the craft's rotor. It was surgically reattached by surgeons visiting the country, and then amputated in London when the surgery was deemed to have been flawed. Jordan would continue work for the Bond series with a prosthetic foot. The concluding shots involved explosions, which the Japanese government did not allow in a national park; hence, the crew moved to Torremolinos, Spain, which was found to resemble the Japanese landscape.  The shots of the volcano were filmed at Shinmoedake on Kyushu Island.

The sets of SPECTRE's volcano base, including operative heliport and monorail, were constructed at a lot inside Pinewood Studios, at a cost of $1 million. Locations outside Japan included using the Royal Navy frigate , then in Gibraltar, for the sea burial, Hong Kong for the scene where Bond fakes his death, and Norway for the Soviet radar station.

Sean Connery's then-wife Diane Cilento performed the swimming scenes for at least five Japanese actresses, including Mie Hama. Martial arts expert Donn F. Draeger provided martial arts training, and also doubled for Connery. Lewis Gilbert's regular editor, Thelma Connell, was originally hired to edit the film. However, after her initial, almost three-hour cut received a terrible response from test audiences, Peter R. Hunt was asked to re-edit the film. Hunt's cut proved a much greater success, and he was awarded the director's chair on the next film as a result.

Music 

The soundtrack was the fourth of the series to be composed by John Barry. He tried to incorporate the "elegance of the Oriental sound" with Japanese music-inspired tracks. The theme song, "You Only Live Twice", was composed by Barry and lyricist Leslie Bricusse, and sung by Nancy Sinatra after her father Frank Sinatra passed on the opportunity. Nancy Sinatra was reported to be very nervous while recording – first she wanted to leave the studio; then she claimed to sometimes "sound like Minnie Mouse". Barry declared that the final song uses 25 different takes.

There are two versions of the song "You Only Live Twice", sung by Nancy Sinatra, one directly from the movie soundtrack, and a second one for record release arranged by Billy Strange. The movie soundtrack song is widely recognised for its striking opening bars and oriental flavour, and was far more popular on radio. The record release reached No. 44 on the Billboard charts in the US, and No. 11 in the UK. Both versions of the title song are available on CD.

A different title song was originally recorded by Julie Rogers, but eventually discarded. Only two lines from that version were kept in the final lyrics, and the orchestral part was changed to fit Sinatra's vocal range. Rogers' version only appeared in a James Bond 30th Anniversary CD, with no singer credit. In the 1990s, an alternative example of a possible theme song (also called "You Only Live Twice" and sung by Lorraine Chandler) was discovered in the vaults of RCA Records. It became a very popular track with followers of the Northern soul scene (Chandler was well known for her high-quality soul output on RCA) and can be found on several RCA soul compilations.

Promotion 
To promote the film, United Artists Television produced a one-hour colour television programme titled Welcome to Japan, Mr. Bond, which first aired on 2 June 1967 in the United States on NBC. Bond regulars Lois Maxwell and Desmond Llewelyn appeared, playing respectively Miss Moneypenny and Q. Kate O'Mara appears as Miss Moneypenny's assistant. The programme shows clips from You Only Live Twice and the then four existing Bond films, and contained a storyline of Moneypenny trying to establish the identity of Bond's bride.

Release and reception 
You Only Live Twice premiered at the Odeon Leicester Square in London on 12 June 1967, with Queen Elizabeth II in attendance. The film opened the following day in the United Kingdom and United States, set an opening day record at the Odeon Leicester Square, and went to number one in the United States with a weekend gross of $600,000. It grossed $7 million from 161 theaters in the United States in its first three weeks, and was number one for seven weeks. The film grossed $43 million in the United States and over $68 million worldwide.

Contemporary reviews 
Roger Ebert of the Chicago Sun-Times awarded the film two-and-a-half stars out of four, in which he criticised the focus on gadgets, declaring "the formula fails to work its magic. Like its predecessor Thunderball, another below-par entry, this one is top-heavy with gadgets but weak on plotting and getting everything to work at the same time." Bosley Crowther, reviewing for The New York Times, felt "there's enough of the bright and bland bravado of the popular British super-sleuth mixed into this melee of rocket-launching to make it a bag of good Bond fun. And there's so much of that scientific clatter – so much warring of super-capsules out in space and fussing with electronic gadgets in a great secret underground launching pad – that this way out adventure picture should be the joy and delight of the youngsters and give pleasure to the reasonable adults who can find release in the majestically absurd." Charles Champlin of the Los Angeles Times wrote the film was "a fast, funny, no-holds-barred piece of outrageous nonsense."

Variety stated more positively: "As entertainment [You Only Live Twice] compares favorably in quality and is replete with as many fights, gadgets, and beauties as its predecessors". Time magazine was sharply critical of the film, claiming the franchise had become "the victim of the same misfortune that once befell Frankenstein: there have been so many flamboyant imitations that the original looks like a copy." The review later derided that "the effects are ineffective. The outer-space sequences would be more appropriate in a grade school educational short entitled Our Amazing Universe, and the volcanic climax is a series of clumsy process shots that no one took the trouble to fix. Even Connery seems uncomfortable and fatigued..." Clifford Terry of the Chicago Tribune remarked that "a large percentage of You Only Live Twice is disappointing, lacking the wit and zip, the pacing and punch, of its predecessors, especially the first three. Roald Dahl's script is larded with sex-slanted jokes that are either pathetically feeble or sophomorically coarse, Bond's patented puns are punier and even Connery's enthusiasm for his shrewd, suave, and sensual character seems to have waned."

Retrospective reviews 
On the review aggregation website Rotten Tomatoes, the film holds an approval rating of 73% based on 49 reviews with an average rating of 6.53/10. The website's critical consensus reads, "With exotic locales, impressive special effects, and a worthy central villain, You Only Live Twice overcomes a messy and implausible story to deliver another memorable early Bond flick." James Berardinelli of ReelViews said that the first half was good, but "It's only during the second half, as the plot escalates beyond the bounds of preposterousness, that the film starts to fragment", criticising Blofeld's appearance and stating "rockets that swallow up spacecraft are a bit too extravagant." Ali Barclay of BBC Films lightly criticized Dahl's script, writing that Dahl had "clearly helped thrust Bond into a whole new world of villainy and technology, maybe his concepts were slightly ahead of themselves, or maybe he just tried too hard." Leo Goldsmith lauded the volcano base as "the most impressive of Ken Adam's sets for the franchise." Danny Peary wrote that You Only Live Twice "should have been about twenty minutes shorter" and described it as "not a bad Bond film, but it doesn't compare to its predecessors – the formula had become a little stale."

IGN ranked You Only Live Twice as the fourth-best Bond film, and Entertainment Weekly as the second-best, considering that it "pushes the series to the outer edge of coolness". However, Norman Wilner of MSN chose it as the fifth-worst, criticising the plot, action scenes and lack of screentime for Blofeld. Literary critic Paul Simpson called the film one of the most colourful of the series and credited the prefecture of Kagoshima for adding "a good flavour" of Japanese influence on the film, but he panned the depiction of Blofeld as a "let-down", "small, bald and a whooping scar". Simon Winder said that the film is "perfect" for parodies of the series. John Brosnan, in his book James Bond in the Cinema, compared the film to an episode of Thunderbirds with a reliance on gadgetry, but admitted it had pace and spectacle. Christopher Null considered the film to be one of James Bond's most memorable adventures, but the plot "protracting and quite confusing".

The film is recognised by the American Film Institute in these lists:
 2003: AFI's 100 Years...100 Heroes & Villains:
 Ernst Stavro Blofeld – Nominated Villain

See also 
 Outline of James Bond

References

External links 

 
 
 
 
 
 
 
 MGM's site on the movie

 
1960s action films
1960s spy films
1960s thriller films
1967 films
British sequel films
British spy thriller films
Cold War spy films
1960s English-language films
Films about terrorism in Europe
Films directed by Lewis Gilbert
Films produced by Harry Saltzman
Films produced by Albert R. Broccoli
Films scored by John Barry (composer)
Films set in Hong Kong
Films set in Japan
Films set on islands
Films shot at Pinewood Studios
Films shot in England
Films shot in Gibraltar
Films shot in Spain
Films shot in Tokyo
Films shot in the Bahamas
Films shot in Virginia
James Bond films
Ninja films
Films with screenplays by Roald Dahl
United Artists films
Eon Productions films
Films with screenplays by Harold Jack Bloom
Japan in non-Japanese culture
1960s British films